John Martin Cummins (born March 12, 1942) is a Canadian politician. He was the leader of the British Columbia Conservative Party from 2011 until resigning after the 2013 election. He was the Conservative Member of Parliament for the riding of Delta—Richmond East in British Columbia from 1993 until 2011, when he turned to provincial politics becoming the leader of the unaffiliated provincial party.

Born in Georgetown, Ontario, he was first elected to the House of Commons in the 1993 election, as a Reform Party member. He was re-elected in 1997, 2000 (as a member of the Canadian Alliance), 2004, 2006, and 2008 (as a Conservative).

Education
Cummins obtained a bachelor's degree from the University of Western Ontario where he attended King's University College and a master's degree from the University of British Columbia.

Before politics
Before entering politics, Cummins worked in the pulp and paper industry in Ontario, the oil fields of Alberta and on the construction of the Bennett hydroelectric dam in Northern BC. He taught school in the Northwest Territories and in the Peace River district of Northern Alberta, then spent fifteen years teaching in Delta, British Columbia. Cummins is also a commercial fisherman; he owned and operated commercial fishing boats in BC for over 20 years.

Politics
As a Member of Parliament, Cummins served twice as party critic for Fisheries and Oceans, in addition to his work on various other House of Commons and Joint Committees.

On October 19, 2010, Bill Tieleman wrote about John Cummins convention speech where Tieleman writes that "the BC Conservatives are going to target not only disgruntled BC Liberal voters but also the NDP's traditional support bases".

On March 12, 2011, Cummins announced that he would not be seeking re-election in the federal election held on May 2, 2011. On March 29, 2011, Cummins announced he would seek the leadership of the British Columbia Conservative Party, and was acclaimed leader at the party's convention on May 28, 2011.

On November 28, 2011, Cummins recommended that a review of the Royal Canadian Mounted Police in BC, including whether a provincial police force should be considered. This was announced following a review from Brian Peckford.

Controversies
During an interview on CFAX 1070 Radio on May 11, 2011, prior to becoming leader of the BC Conservatives, Cummins was questioned by the host of the radio show about his stance on gay rights following a suggestion that homosexuality was a choice. His response was: "That's my understanding of the issue,". He followed up by stating "There are folks that will tell you they're born that way, and that's fine. I don't discriminate". He issued an apology a couple days later, saying "My comments on CFAX radio this past Wednesday may have been misinterpreted and may have offended some. I apologize for that".

References

External links
Official site
How'd They Vote?: John Cummins' voting history and quotes

1942 births
Living people
British Columbia Conservative Party leaders
Canadian Alliance MPs
Canadian schoolteachers
Conservative Party of Canada MPs
Members of the House of Commons of Canada from British Columbia
People from Richmond, British Columbia
Reform Party of Canada MPs
University of Western Ontario alumni
University of British Columbia alumni
21st-century Canadian politicians
British Columbia Conservative Party candidates in British Columbia provincial elections